Below are the squads for the 2015 EAFF East Asian Cup tournament, held in China PR. There were 23 players in each squad, including 3 goalkeepers.

Coach:  Alain Perrin

Coach:  Vahid Halilhodžić

Coach:  Kim Chang-bok

Coach:  Uli Stielike

References

EAFF E-1 Football Championship squads